The National Down Syndrome Congress (NDSC) is a  national not-for-profit organization that provides individuals, families, and health care providers information  and support  about Down syndrome, as well as advocating with and on behalf of individuals with Down syndrome.

The NDSC provides free, up-to-date information concerning all aspects of life with Down syndrome.  The organization also maintains a public policy and legislative advocacy team in Washington, D.C.

History

The NDSC was an outgrowth of meetings held by the Arc of the United States, and the NDSC was officially formed in 1973. It was the first organization to focus specifically on the needs of individuals with Down syndrome, rather than generalized intellectual or cognitive disabilities. Though originally based in Illinois, the national headquarters is now in Atlanta, Georgia.

In 2020, Shauntel Neal-Howe, of Spring, Texas was elected president of the organization. Since 2003, David Tolleson has served as executive director.

Convention

Each year, the NDSC hosts the world's largest convention for individuals with Down syndrome and their families. The 2020 convention was changed to a virtual format due to the COVID-19 pandemic.  The 2021 convention will be held will be held July 8–11 in Phoenix, Arizona. The convention has four main components—the General Convention, for parents and other family members, as well as professionals who work in the disability field; the Youth & Adults Conference, for teens and adults with Down syndrome; the Brothers & Sisters Conference, for school-age siblings; and, Kids' Camp, for children with and without Down syndrome.  The Down Syndrome Medical Interest Group—USA usually holds its annual symposium in conjunction with the NDSC Convention.

The convention brings in world-renowned researchers and experts on Down syndrome and education to speak to parents about a variety of issues across the lifespan from infant nutrition and early childhood education through high school transitions and job placement through aging and nutrition issues.  Learning tracks have included sessions for adult siblings as well as for families with a member who has a co-occurring diagnosis of Down syndrome and an autism spectrum disorder.  In recent years, convention attendance has been around 4,000, with attendees coming from most U.S. states, and multiple nations.

Throughout its history, the NDSC Annual Convention has moved around the United States.

References

Down syndrome organizations
Disability organizations based in the United States